Cícero Casimiro Sanches Semedo (born 8 May 1986), known simply as Cícero, is a Guinea-Bissauan professional footballer who plays as a forward for Portuguese club S.C. Salgueiros.

Club career
A product of S.C. Braga's youth system, Cícero was in born in Seia, Guarda District. He was promoted to the first team for the 2004–05 campaign, making his official debut with the main squad in a 2–2 away draw against Académica de Coimbra on 30 August 2004. On 21 November, as a second-half substitute, he scored his first Primeira Liga goal, in a 2–0 home win over G.D. Estoril Praia.

In January 2005, Cícero moved to Russia for FC Dynamo Moscow as many Portuguese players (or playing in the league) during that period, returning to Portugal in the 2009 January transfer window and joining Braga rivals Vitória de Guimarães. In the summer, he signed with Segunda Liga club U.D. Oliveirense in a season-long loan.

On 25 June 2013, Cícero joined FC Astana of the Kazakhstan Premier League on a year-long move. He subsequently returned to Paços de Ferreira.

In the following years, Cícero represented in quick succession Şanlıurfaspor (Turkish TFF First League), Paços de Ferreira, F.C. Arouca, C.D. Trofense, S.C. Beira-Mar and Anadia FC (the last three clubs in the lower leagues of Portugal).

International career
Cícero represented Portugal at youth level. He earned his first senior cap for Guinea-Bissau on 9 October 2010, playing the full 90 minutes in a 1–0 away loss against Angola for the 2012 Africa Cup of Nations qualifiers.

International goals
(Guinea-Bissau score listed first, score column indicates score after each Cícero goal)

References

External links

1986 births
Living people
People from Seia
Citizens of Guinea-Bissau through descent
Portuguese sportspeople of Bissau-Guinean descent
Sportspeople from Guarda District
Black Portuguese sportspeople
Portuguese footballers
Bissau-Guinean footballers
Association football forwards
Primeira Liga players
Liga Portugal 2 players
Segunda Divisão players
S.C. Braga B players
S.C. Braga players
Vitória S.C. players
U.D. Oliveirense players
Rio Ave F.C. players
F.C. Paços de Ferreira players
Moreirense F.C. players
F.C. Arouca players
C.D. Trofense players
S.C. Beira-Mar players
Anadia F.C. players
S.C. Salgueiros players
Russian Premier League players
FC Dynamo Moscow players
Kazakhstan Premier League players
FC Astana players
TFF First League players
Şanlıurfaspor footballers
Portugal youth international footballers
Portugal under-21 international footballers
Guinea-Bissau international footballers
Portuguese expatriate footballers
Bissau-Guinean expatriate footballers
Expatriate footballers in Russia
Expatriate footballers in Kazakhstan
Expatriate footballers in Turkey
Portuguese expatriate sportspeople in Russia
Bissau-Guinean expatriate sportspeople in Russia
Bissau-Guinean expatriate sportspeople in Kazakhstan
Bissau-Guinean expatriate sportspeople in Turkey